Glyphipterix isoclista is a species of sedge moth in the genus Glyphipterix. It was described by Edward Meyrick in 1925. It is found in Fiji.

References

Moths described in 1925
Glyphipterigidae
Moths of Fiji